Hammondsport Union Free School, also known as Hammondsport Academy and Hammondsport High School, is a historic school building located at Hammondsport in Steuben County, New York.  It is a three-story stone structure in the Italianate style.  The earliest section was built in 1858 as a private secondary school, Hammondsport Academy.  It was converted to a public union school in 1875, and was expanded in three additions over the next 38 years (1891, 1898, and 1913).  It served as a school until 1935 and has been used for other public functions, including as the original home of the Glenn H. Curtiss Museum from 1962 to 1994, and for many years as the Hammondsport Public Library and municipal offices.

It was listed on the National Register of Historic Places in 2008.  It was converted to apartments by Arbor Housing and Development, a non-profit group in Bath, NY.

See also 
Hammondsport Central School District

References

School buildings on the National Register of Historic Places in New York (state)
Italianate architecture in New York (state)
School buildings completed in 1858
Buildings and structures in Steuben County, New York
National Register of Historic Places in Steuben County, New York